Aadat is a Pakistani drama serial directed Adnan Wai Qureshi.

Aadat may also refer to:
 Aadat (album), a 2004 studio album by the Pakistani band Jal
 "Aadat" (song), a 2003 song by Atif Aslam and Jal, remade in 2004 by Farhan Saeed and Jal